Manby is a surname, and may refer to:

 Aaron Manby (ironmaster) (1776–1850), ironmaster and civil engineer
 Sir Alan Reeve Manby (1848–1925), Surgeon-Apothecary In Ordinary to the Prince of Wales at Sandringham and later Physician Extraordinary
Bronwen Manby, British human rights scholar and lobbyist 
 Charles Manby (1804–1884), civil engineer and son of Aaron Manby
 Dave Manby, canoeist or kayaker
 Frederic Edward Manby  (1845–1891), surgeon and Mayor of Wolverhampton 1888/1889, elder brother to Alan Reeve Manby
 Captain George William Manby FRS (1765–1864), inventor of the Manby Mortar and the first portable pressurised fire extinguisher
 Joel Manby
 Percy Alan Farrer Manby (1877–1940), Supreme Court Judge Straits Settlements and Federation of Malay States
 Thomas Manby (1769–1834), British naval officer

See also

 Manby in Lincolnshire, UK
 Aaron Manby, first iron steamship to go to sea
 James Manby Gully